Ferrari Elite Sheppard (born March 3, 1983) is an American contemporary visual artist, known for his vibrant, hybridized paintings which blend figurativism and abstract art.   Aside from being a painter, Sheppard is a writer, photographer, activist and record producer. As record producer, Sheppard is half of the alternative hip hop duo Dec 99th, along with Mos Def.

Early life and education 

Ferrari Sheppard was born in Chicago. He spent his childhood in Chicago. Sheppard attended The School of the Art Institute of Chicago.

Career 

After leaving The School of the Art Institute of Chicago, Sheppard took a lengthy hiatus from visual art to pursue a career in journalism and music production.

Sheppard conducted interviews with artists such as M.I.A., Erykah Badu, Saul Williams, Earl Sweatshirt and Little Dragon for Stop Being Famous, a website he founded in 2009.

November 2014, Sheppard appeared on Anthony Bourdain's travel show The Getaway alongside Yasiin Bey. The pair traveled to Marrakesh, Morocco.

In May and June 2016, Sheppard released 3 songs as producer for the alternative hip hop duo Dec 99th with Yasiin Bey – "N.A.W", "Tall Sleeves" and "Local Time".

On August 1, 2016, Dec 99th released their fourth song on Tidal titled "Hymn" accompanied by a statement from the pair, "Condolences to the families of the slain. Never stop pursuing freedom," likely a reference to police killings in the United States.

Sheppard and Bey released their highly anticipated, self-titled debut album, December 99th exclusively on Tidal (service) in 2016.

In 2016, Sheppard returned to visual art, participating in group shows and had his first solo exhibition September 12, 2020.

Sheppard's art studio is located in Los Angeles, California.

Exhibitions 

 2020: Black Voices Black Microcosm, CF Hill Gallery, Stockholm, Sweden
 2020: MoAD Benefit Auction, The Museum of the African Diaspora, San Francisco, California 
 2020: Heroines of Innocence (solo), Wilding Cran Gallery, Los Angeles, California

Social and political activism

2010–11: Haiti Earthquake 

Sheppard organized a benefit concert in Chicago called Every Drop Counts for 2010 Haiti earthquake relief. The concert featured live music from Jean Grae, Dead Prez, Rhymefest, Mystic, GLC, The Cool Kids, and Kids These Days, as well as social commentary from Haki Madhubuti and Fred Hampton, Jr. The benefit was to raise funds for clean drinking water in orphanages and schools in Port-au-Prince.

2012–13: Open Forum: South Africa 

Sheppard was a US delegate at Open Society Foundation and OSISA's Open Forum 2012 in Cape Town, South Africa. International artists, activists, and leaders took part in The Paradox of Unequal Growth, a discussion centered on China and the International Monetary Fund's role in the development of Africa.

2013–14: Israel-Palestine 

Sheppard traveled to Israel-Palestine as part of an African-American delegation sponsored by The Carter Center. In February 2014, Sheppard appeared on HuffPost Live to discuss his travel to the region and his article about the trip.

Discography

with Mos Def as Dec 99th 
 December 99th (2016)

References

External links 
 Ferrari Sheppard on Twitter
 Ferrari Sheppard on Instagram

Living people
20th-century American painters
American essayists
African-American writers
African-American musicians
American electronic musicians
American experimental musicians
American male essayists
1983 births
21st-century African-American artists
20th-century African-American painters
21st-century American painters
African-American male writers